The Battle of Pipli Sahib also known as Battle of Amritsar was a battle fought by the Sikh Misls and the Durrani Empire. This battle is also referred to as Badla Singhan Da (Revenge of the Sikhs) and was fought after the great Sikh holocaust (Vadda Ghalughara).

Background

After the Battle of Kup, the Sikhs made up their minds to wash away the defeat. Ahmad Shah Abdali had returned to Lahore. He sent a person to the Sikh leaders in quality of ambassador to negotiate peace with them and prevent that effusion of blood which their desperate determination threatened to produce. However, when this ambassador arrived at the Sikh camps, instead of listening to his proposals, the Sikhs plundered him and his followers and drove them away. He did not waste any time and arrived at the outskirts of Amritsar.

Battle

The Sikhs had gathered around at Amritsar in order to celebrate Diwali which was on October 17 that year. The Sikhs attacked the Afghans so vehemently and didn't care about their own lives at all. The battle was fought under the grey light of a total solar eclipse. The battle raged furiously from early morning till late night. They both decided to stop for the night and fight the next day. During the night Ahmad Shah Abdali and his forces had retreated to Lahore.

Aftermath

The Sikhs finally got their revenge from the Ghalaghura. The Shah left Lahore on December 12, 1762, and Kabuli Mal was appointed governor of Lahore. As for the Sikhs, they had left Amritsar, crossed the Sutlej River and slipped into the Lakhi Jungle.

References

Works cited

See also 

 Nihang
 Martyrdom and Sikhism

Battles involving the Sikhs